Denis Lacey (31 May 1889 – 18 February 1923) was an Irish Republican Army officer during the Irish War of Independence and anti-Treaty IRA officer during the Irish Civil War.

Early life and Irish War of Independence
Lacey was born in 1889 in a village called Attybrick, near Annacarty, County Tipperary. His parents were Thomas Lacy and Ellen Hayes. He worked as a clerk and manager of a coal merchant in Tipperary Town, prior to the Irish War of Independence.

He joined the Irish Volunteers in 1913 and was sworn into the secretive Irish Republican Brotherhood in 1914. He was introduced to the IRB by Seán Treacy. During the War of Independence (1919–1921) he was selected to command an IRA flying column of the 3rd Tipperary Brigade, in September 1920. The flying column  mounted two successful ambushes of British forces - killing six British soldiers at Thomastown near Golden, and four Royal Irish Constabulary men at Lisnagaul in the Glen of Aherlow.

In April 1921, following another ambush of British troops near Clogheen, he captured RIC inspector Gilbert Potter, whom he later executed in reprisal of the British hanging of republican prisoners.

Civil War
In December 1921, his unit split over the Anglo-Irish Treaty. Lacey opposed the Treaty and most of his men followed suit. Lacey took over commanded of the Third Tipperary Brigade as Séumas Robinson was appointed to command the anti-Treaty IRA's Second Southern Division. In the ensuing civil war (June 1922-May 1923), he organised guerrilla activity in the Tipperary area against Irish Free State (pro-Treaty) forces.

He was killed in an action against Free State troops at Ballydavid, near Bansha in the Glen of Aherlow on 18 February 1923. He was 33 years old. Over 1,000 Free State troops, under the command of General John T. Prout, with the intention of breaking up his guerrilla unit, converged on the Glen where he and four other men from his column were billeted. Lacey and one of his men were killed and others captured.  Two National Army soldiers were killed in the action.

A memorial in Annacarty commemorates Lacey's war service and subsequent death in action.

It was England gave the orders and England gave the guns and Cosgrave dyed the khaki green to kill our gallant sons they spilt their blood upon the grass and thought it no disgrace when they murdered Dinny Lacey the noblest of our race.

In popular culture
Lacey is mentioned in the Irish folk ballad "The Galtee Mountain Boy", along with Seán Moylan, Dan Breen, and Seán Hogan. The song, written by Patsy Halloran, recalls some of the travels of a "Flying column" from Tipperary as they fought during the Irish War of Independence, and later against the pro-Treaty side during the Irish Civil War.

References

Sources

Irish Republican Army (1919–1922) members
People of the Irish War of Independence
People of the Irish Civil War (Anti-Treaty side)
People from County Tipperary
Deaths by firearm in Ireland
1890 births
1923 deaths